The Adoration of the Magi is a 1565-1567 painting by El Greco. It and his St Luke Painting the Madonna and Child are his most western works, with Adoration showing the particularly strong influence of Parmigianino at this time in his career. It may have been painted in Venice or elsewhere during his stay in Italy or for an Italian client living in the painter's native Crete, but this is debated. It is now in the Benaki Museum in Athens.

Bibliography
 ÁLVAREZ LOPERA, José, El Greco, Madrid, Arlanza, 2005, Biblioteca «Descubrir el Arte», (colección «Grandes maestros»). .
 SCHOLZ-HÄNSEL, Michael, El Greco, Colonia, Taschen, 2003. .
 https://web.archive.org/web/20101129110531/http://www.artehistoria.jcyl.es/genios/cuadros/6292.htm

1565 paintings
Paintings by El Greco
El Greco
Cretan Renaissance paintings